This is a list of uncrewed spaceflights to the Salyut space stations. The list includes Soyuz 34, which was launched uncrewed but landed crewed, however it does not include Soyuz 32, which was launched crewed, but landed uncrewed.

Prior to the launch of Salyut 6, the only uncrewed spaceflights of the Salyut programme were the stations themselves, and the Soyuz 20 spacecraft, which docked with Salyut 4.

Salyut 4

Salyut 6

Salyut 7

See also
 Salyut programme
 List of human spaceflights to Salyut space stations
 List of Salyut expeditions
 List of Salyut visitors
 List of Salyut spacewalks
 List of uncrewed spaceflights to Mir
 Uncrewed spaceflights to the International Space Station
 List of space stations

Notes

References

Salyut program
Salyut uncrewed spaceflights
Uncrewed spacecraft
Salyut